Zhang Qing (born 31 January 1966) is a Chinese speed skater. She competed at the 1988 Winter Olympics and the 1992 Winter Olympics.

References

1966 births
Living people
Chinese female speed skaters
Olympic speed skaters of China
Speed skaters at the 1988 Winter Olympics
Speed skaters at the 1992 Winter Olympics
Sportspeople from Heilongjiang
Speed skaters at the 1986 Asian Winter Games
Speed skaters at the 1990 Asian Winter Games
Medalists at the 1990 Asian Winter Games
Asian Games medalists in speed skating
Asian Games bronze medalists for China
20th-century Chinese women
21st-century Chinese women